"Impossible to Fly" is a song by Australian rock band Baby Animals. It was released in November 1992. It was the first new music from the band since the release of the multi-platinum selling debut studio album, Baby Animals (1991). The song peaked at number 48 on the ARIA Chart.

Track listings
Australian CD single (25022)
 "Impossible to Fly" – 3:15
 "Waste of Time" (Live) – 5:03
 "Big Time Friends" (Live) – 6:25
 "Impossible to Fly" (Live) – 3:57

 Live tracks recorded at Newcastle Civic Theatre, New South Wales in June 1992.

Charts

External links

References

1992 songs
1992 singles
Baby Animals songs
Song recordings produced by Mike Chapman